Konrad is a German (with variants Kunz and Kunze) given name and surname that means "bold counselor" and may refer to:

People

Given name

Surname
Alexander Konrad (1890–1940), Russian explorer
Antoine Konrad (born 1975), birth name of DJ Antoine, Swiss DJ
Carina Konrad (born 1982), German politician
Christoph Werner Konrad (born 1957), German politician
Edmond Konrad (1909–1997), Rear Admiral, United States Navy
Franz Konrad (racing driver) (born 1951), Austrian racing driver
Franz Konrad (SS officer) (1906–1952), German SS officer executed for war crimes
Franz Conrad von Hötzendorf (1852–1925), Chief of the General Staff of the Austro-Hungarian Army at outbreak of World War I
Franz Konrad von Rodt (1706–1775), Bishop of Constance
György Konrád (1933–2019), Hungarian writer
Rudolf Konrad (1891–1964), German general during World War II
Michaela Konrad (born 1972), Austrian artist
Otto Konrad (born 1964), Austrian football player
Paul Konrad (1877–1948), Swiss geometrician and mycologist
Rob Konrad (born 1976), American football player
Ulrich Konrad (born 1957), German musicologist
Franz Konrad von Stadion und Thannhausen (1679–1757), Prince-Bishop of Bamberg

Royalty
Konrad I of Germany (890–918)
Konrad II, Holy Roman Emperor of the German People (990–1039)
Konrad III of Germany (1093–1152)
Konrad IV of Germany (1228–1254)
Konrad II of Germany and Italy (1074–1101)
Konrad I of Masovia (1187–1247)
Konrad I, Count of Württemberg (died 1110)
Konrad II, Count of Württemberg (died 1143)

Fiction
Konrad Saga, a series of novels by David Ferring – see §The Konrad Saga
Konrad (assassin), a character in the 1999 novel All Tomorrow's Parties by William Gibson
Konrad Curze, a character in Warhammer 40,000 and Primarch of the Night Lords Space Marine Legion that serves Chaos Undivided
John Konrad, American Lieutenant Colonel from video game Spec Ops: The Line
Konrad, the protagonist of the poem "Die Geschichte vom Daumenlutscher" from Struwwelpeter

Other uses
 Konrad KM-011, a sportscar
 Operation Konrad, during the Battle of Budapest in January 1945
 Sankt Konrad, Austria
 Schacht Konrad, proposed radioactive waste repository in Germany

See also
Conrad (disambiguation)
Conrad (name) 
Franz Konrad (disambiguation)
Konrads (disambiguation)

German masculine given names
Surnames from given names